This is the list of sportspeople from VSS Burevestnik. Most of them are World Champions or Olympic medalists.

Artistic gymnastics
Athletes, who competed in artistic gymnastics:
Nikolai Andrianov
Viktor Chukarin
Larisa Latynina
Tamara Manina
Boris Shakhlin
Galina Shamrai

Athletics
Athletes, who competed in athletics:
Tatyana Anisimova
Leonid Bartenev
Irina Beglyakova
Hennadiy Bleznitsov
Valeriy Borzov
Valery Brumel
Galina Bystrova
Taisia Chenchik
Galina Chistyakova
Oleg Fyodoseyev
Rodion Gataullin
Maria Golubnichaya
Yelena Gorchakova
Igor Kashkarov
Tatyana Kazankina
Mikhail Krivonosov
Vasili Kuznetsov
Leonid Lytvynenko
Yevgeny Mironov
Edvin Ozolin
Elvīra Ozoliņa
Natalya Pomoshchnikova-Voronova
Vera Popkova
Anatoli Samotsvetov
Yuriy Sedykh
Tatyana Shchelkanova
Igor Ter-Ovanesyan
Lyudmila Maslakova

Basketball
Athletes, who competed in basketball:
Sergei Kovalenko
Kazys Petkevičius

Boxing
Athletes, who competed in boxing:
Gennadi Shatkov

Chess
Athletes, who competed in chess:
Nona Gaprindashvili
Vasily Smyslov

Cross-country skiing
Athletes, who competed in cross-country skiing:
Alevtina Kolchina
Lyubov Kozyreva
Igor Voronchikin

Fencing
Athletes, who competed in fencing:
Mark Midler

Handball
Athletes, who competed in handball:
Aleksandr Anpilogov
Valeri Gassy
Vasily Ilyin

Speed skating
Athletes who competed in speed skating:
Tatyana Averina
Yevgeny Kulikov
Valery Muratov
Natalya Petrusyova
Tamara Rylova
Lidia Skoblikova
Lyudmila Titova

Wrestling
Athletes, who competed in wrestling:
Alexander Medved